Blambangan Peninsula is located at the southeastern of Java Island. Administratively this peninsula is in Banyuwangi Regency. It is the location of the  Alas Purwo National Park. This peninsula contains Cape Bantenan, the southernmost point of Java and Cape Slaka, the easternmost point of Java.

World’s Biosphere Reserves
In mid-March 2016, UNESCO declared Blambangan Biosphere Reserve to consist of four conservation areas, namely the Alas Purwo National Park, the Baluran National Park, the Meru Betiri National Park, and Ijen Crater Natural Reserve. It is the eleventh of Indonesia's biosphere reserves acknowledged by UNESCO.

References

Banyuwangi (town)
Peninsulas of Indonesia
Landforms of East Java